The Geurie crossing loop collision occurred on the night of 23 August 1963.  Geurie is located between Orange and Dubbo in New South Wales, Australia.

Events 
The Sydney-bound Bourke Mail train, with 110 passengers, was steaming towards Geurie station. The locomotive was C38 Pacific steam engine, 3817. Standing in the loop, beside a grain silo,  was a goods train, hauled by a  Beyer-Garratt AD60 class locomotive 6003. It was refuged so as to cross the Mail train.

The fouling point, as was common practice at the time, was marked by a white lamp on a white post located quite close to the actual fouling point.  The points at the entrance to the loop were operated by a ground frame and interlocked with signals using annett keys.  There were no track circuits over the points which might have detected the foul locomotive and thus held the home signal at "red" and thus stopped the mail train short of the obstruction.

The impact of the two locomotives colliding forced the Garratt into the side of the silo and reared up its boiler section on to its leading water unit. 3817 was derailed and pushed over on to its side. Three carriages of the Mail train were also derailed.

Damages 
A total of 19 passengers aboard the Mail train were injured.

Due to the considerable damage to both locomotives and the decline of steam traction then under way, neither 6003 nor 3817 returned to service.

See also 

 Zanthus train collision
 Lists of rail accidents

References 

Railway accidents and incidents in New South Wales
1963 in Australia
Railway accidents in 1963
Accidents and incidents involving New South Wales Government Railways
1960s in New South Wales
August 1963 events in Australia
Train collisions in Australia
Main Western railway line, New South Wales
Central West (New South Wales)
1963 disasters in Australia